Alex Biega (born April 4, 1988) is a Canadian former professional ice hockey defenceman. Biega was selected by the Buffalo Sabres in the 5th round (147th overall) of the 2006 NHL Entry Draft and played the majority of his career with the Vancouver Canucks.

Playing career
As a youth, Biega played in the 2001 and 2002 Quebec International Pee-Wee Hockey Tournaments with a minor ice hockey team from West Island, Montreal.

Amateur
Biega was drafted by the Rimouski Océanic in the first round (11th overall) of the 2004 QMJHL Entry Draft, but choose instead to play high school hockey at Salisbury School in Salisbury, Connecticut. Biega then attended Harvard University, where he played four seasons of NCAA Division I ice hockey with the Harvard Crimson men's ice hockey team. Biega was a standout player for the Crimson where, in his freshman season, he was named to the ECAC Hockey All-Rookie team, and in his junior year he was awarded the John Tudor Memorial Cup as the Crimson's most valuable player. In his senior year, Biega was named the team's captain.

Professional
Biega was selected by the Buffalo Sabres in the 2006 NHL Entry Draft. Upon graduation from university, on May 27, 2010, Biega was signed by the Sabres to a two-year contract. He attended his first Sabres training camp, but was cut and sent to the team's American Hockey League (AHL) affiliate, the Portland Pirates. On October 9, 2010 Biega made his professional debut playing with the Pirates, and on November 20, 2010, scored his first professional goal to help his team to a 2–1 win over the visiting Worcester Sharks. He went on to play in 61 regular-season games with the Pirates during the 2010–11 AHL season and also played 12 playoff games during his rookie campaign. Biega spent the entire 2011–12 season with the Rochester Americans, the new AHL affiliate of the Buffalo Sabres. He registered 5 goals and 25 points in 72 games and played in 3 playoff games with no points.

On July 5, 2013, Biega agreed to a one-year contract as a free agent with the Vancouver Canucks. He was assigned to AHL affiliate, the Utica Comets for their inaugural season in 2013–14, appearing in a career-high 73 games for 22 points from the blueline. On July 1, 2014, Biega re-signed with the Canucks, on a one-year contract worth $600,000. He was called up to Vancouver after posting 10 points in 25 games with Utica. Biega made his NHL debut with the Canucks on February 16, 2015, scoring his first NHL goal in a 3–2 win over the Minnesota Wild. Biega's goal would be the game winner. He finished the season with 7 games played for the Canucks, scoring the one goal. With the Comets, he finished with 3 goals and 19 points in 69 regular season games and four points in 16 playoff games en route to the Calder Cup final.

Biega started the  season with the Comets where he was named captain. He was called up to the Canucks in mid-December and on December 20, 2015, Biega earned his first career assist. It came on a Jannik Hansen goal in a 5−4 shootout loss to the Florida Panthers. On February 2, 2016, Biega signed a one-way, two-year contract extension valued at $1.5 million. At the start of the 2016–17 NHL season, Biega made the Canucks out of training camp, but only appeared in one game as a forward before being sent down to the Comets for a conditioning stint in November. In 2017–18, Biega played 31 games with the Canucks, registering 6 assists. On February 28, 2018, Biega was again signed to a two-year, $1.65 million contract extension by the Canucks. Biega made the Canucks out of camp again at the start of the 2018–19 NHL season, but was sent down to Utica on October 18 not having played a game. He was recalled on October 25 and scored his first goal of the season and second overall for the Canucks in an overtime loss to the Chicago Blackhawks on February 7, 2019. He finished the season appearing in 41 games, scoring two goals and registering 16 points.

On September 30, 2019, Biega was placed on waivers by the Canucks, prior to the start of the 2019–20 NHL season. He cleared waivers the next day. On October 6, 2019, Biega was traded by the Canucks to the Detroit Red Wings in exchange for David Pope. He made his debut for the Red Wings on October 15, in a game against his former team, the Vancouver Canucks. He finished the season with 3 points in 48 games with the Red Wings. On March 9, 2020, Biega signed a one-year contract extension with the Red Wings. During the pandemic-shortened 2020–21 season, Biega was placed on waivers for the purpose of transferring him to the Red Wings' taxi squad. He finished the season with 3 points in 13 games with the Red Wings.

On July 28, 2021, having left the Red Wings as a free agent, Biega was signed to a one-year, two-way contract with the Toronto Maple Leafs. Biega saw little action with the Maple Leafs, playing in only two games. He made his debut for the Maple Leafs on January 1, 2022 against the Ottawa Senators. He played in 31 games with the Maple Leafs AHL affiliate, the Toronto Marlies. On March 21, 2022, Biega was traded to the Nashville Predators for future considerations. He was assigned to the Predators' AHL affiliate, the Milwaukee Admirals.

On December 19, 2022 Biega announced his retirement from professional hockey.

Personal life
Biega's brother, Danny Biega, was also a professional ice hockey player who last played for the Carolina Hurricanes. He also has two other brothers, Marc and Michael. Alex, Danny, and Michael all played hockey for Harvard University, becoming the first trio of brothers since 2000 to play for Harvard.

Biega met his wife Diana while in Boston. They had a son together in April 2015. While with the Vancouver Canucks, Biega became involved with the National Hockey League Players Association's Core Development Program, which helps former NHL players transition from their hockey careers post retirement, helping to develop the program.

Career statistics

Regular season and playoffs

International

Awards and honours

References

External links

1988 births
Living people
Anglophone Quebec people
Buffalo Sabres draft picks
Canadian ice hockey defencemen
Detroit Red Wings players
Harvard Crimson men's ice hockey players
Milwaukee Admirals players
Portland Pirates players
Rochester Americans players
Ice hockey people from Montreal
Toronto Maple Leafs players
Toronto Marlies players
Utica Comets players
Vancouver Canucks players